Maccabi Petah Tikva F.C. (Hebrew: מַכַּבִּי פֶּתַח תִּקְוָה) (full name: "Maccabi Avshalom Ironi Petah Tikva F.C., Hebrew: מועדון ספורט מכבי אבשלום עירוני פתח תקווה) is an Israeli football club based in the city of Petah Tikva. It is part of the Maccabi sports club and currently plays in the Israeli Premier League.

Israeli Premier League

Transfers

In

References

External links
Official website

Maccabi Petah Tikva F.C.
Maccabi Petah Tikva F.C.